Jenlain is a commune in the Nord department in northern France.

Inhabitants are called Jenlinois. A Bière de Garde, Jenlain, is brewed there.

Heraldry

See also
Communes of the Nord department

References

External links

 Official website
 Jenlain photos

Communes of Nord (French department)